Langfjordhamn is a village in Loppa Municipality in Troms og Finnmark county, Norway. The village is very isolated with no road access, only boat access. The village on the shore of a fjord surrounded by mountains, with two large glaciers to the east and the west: Øksfjordjøkelen and Langfjordjøkelen.

References

Villages in Finnmark
Loppa
Populated places of Arctic Norway